Cates is an unincorporated community in Fulton Township, Fountain County, Indiana, United States. Estimated population is 125.

History
A post office was established at Cates in 1883, and remained in operation until it was discontinued in 1984. Cates was platted in 1903.

Geography

References

Unincorporated communities in Fountain County, Indiana
Unincorporated communities in Indiana